Milan Tičić  born in Cetinje is a Montenegrin water polo player who plays for  VK Partizan, NOB Glyfada, Rari Nantes Florentia, NC Vouliagmeni, GSS Panionios and VK Budva. Milan won European Waterpolo Championship in Malaga 2008. The epic final was on 13. July against Serbia, Montenegro won 6-5 and Milan scored a goal. He is a member of the Montenegro men's national water polo team at the 2008 Summer Olympics. The team reached the semifinals, where they were defeated by Hungary and finished fourth in the end.

References

Living people
Montenegrin male water polo players
Olympic water polo players of Montenegro
Water polo players at the 2008 Summer Olympics
1979 births
Universiade medalists in water polo
Universiade medalists for Montenegro